The diving environment is the natural or artificial surroundings in which a dive is done. It is usually underwater, but professional diving is sometimes done in other liquids. Underwater diving is the human practice of voluntarily descending below the surface of the water to interact with the surroundings, for various recreational or occupational reasons, but the concept of diving also legally extends to immersion in other liquids, and exposure to other pressurised environments. Some of the more common diving environments are listed and defined here.

The diving environment is limited by accessibility and risk, but includes water and occasionally other liquids. Most underwater diving is done in the shallower coastal parts of the oceans, and inland bodies of fresh water, including lakes, dams, quarries, rivers, springs, flooded caves, reservoirs, tanks, swimming pools, and canals, but may also be done in large bore ducting and sewers, power station cooling systems, cargo and ballast tanks of ships, and liquid-filled industrial equipment. The environment may affect equipment configuration: for instance, freshwater is less dense than saltwater, so less added weight is needed to achieve diver neutral buoyancy in freshwater dives. Water temperature, visibility and movement also affect the diver and the dive plan. Diving in liquids other than water may present special problems due to density, viscosity and chemical compatibility of diving equipment, as well as possible environmental hazards to the diving team.

Benign conditions, sometimes also referred to as confined water, are environments of low risk, where it is extremely unlikely or impossible for the diver to get lost or entrapped, or be exposed to hazards other than the basic underwater environment. These conditions are suitable for initial training in the critical survival skills, and include swimming pools, training tanks, aquarium tanks and some shallow and protected shoreline areas.

Open water is unrestricted water such as a sea, lake or flooded quarry, where the diver has unobstructed direct vertical access to the surface of the water in contact with the atmosphere. Open-water diving implies that if a problem arises, the diver can directly ascend vertically to the atmosphere to breathe air. Wall diving is done along a near vertical face. Blue-water diving is done in  where the bottom is out of sight of the diver and there may be no fixed visual reference. Black-water diving is mid-water diving at night, particularly on a moonless night.

An overhead or penetration diving environment is where the diver enters a space from which there is no direct, purely vertical ascent to the safety of breathable atmosphere at the surface. Cave diving, wreck diving, ice diving and diving inside or under other natural or artificial underwater structures or enclosures are examples. The restriction on direct ascent increases the risk of diving under an overhead, and this is usually addressed by adaptations of procedures and use of equipment such as redundant breathing gas sources and guide lines to indicate the route to the exit.

Night diving can allow the diver to experience a different underwater environment, because many marine animals are nocturnal. Altitude diving, for example in mountain lakes, requires modifications to the decompression schedule because of the reduced atmospheric pressure.

Recreational dive sites 

The common term for a place at which one may dive is a dive site. As a general rule, professional diving is done where the work needs to be done, and recreational diving is done where conditions are suitable. There are many recorded and publicised recreational dive sites which are known for their convenience, points of interest, and frequently favourable conditions.

 – Dive sites in bodies of water other than the sea
 – Dive sites near a coast of the body of water

Diver training sites 
Diver training facilities for both professional and recreational divers generally use a small range of dive sites which are familiar and convenient, and where conditions are predictable and the environmental risk is relatively low.

Hyperbaric treatment and transport environments 
Physiologically and legally a compression in a diving chamber is considered a dive. Various options for hypwrbaric transport and treatment exist, each with its own characteristics, applications and operational procedures.

Environments by confinement 
Confinement can influence diver safety and the ability of the diver to perform the required task. Some types of confinement improve safety by limiting the ability of the diver to move into higher risk areas, others limit the ability of the diver to maneuver or to escape to a place of safety in an emergency.

 The Queensland government define confined water for recreational diving purposes as "Water which offers pool-like conditions, good visibility, and water which is shallow enough so that all divers can stand up with their heads well clear of the water". Other definitions do not require such shallow depth, but may have a depth restriction. 

 – A topographical feature which is open to one side, but obstructed overhead, and deep enough for a diver to be under the overhang.
 – Space through which it is possible for a diver to pass with some difficulty. Section of a cave which is difficult to pass through due to lack of space. A minor restriction is too small for two divers to swim through together, a major restriction requires the diver to remove equipment to fit through.

 – Arch, or short, clear tunnel that has sufficient space to allow a diver to swim through and where the light of the opening at the far end is visible through the hole.
Under ships – usually for inspection, maintenance and repair, or incidentally, when diving from one. In some cases the gap between the ship and the bottom or the jetty or dock can be quite small.

Environments by visibility 
Visibility in the diving medium directly affects diver safety and the ability to complete useful tasks. In some cases this can be mitigated by technology to improve visibility, but often the task procedures must be modified to suit the capacity of the diver, and the diver must have training and equipment bto deal with emergencies under more difficult circumstances.

Environments by hazard 
Besides the hazards associated with the underwater environment itself, there are a considerable variety of hazard types and risk levels to which a diver may be exposed due to the circumstances of the dive task. Many of these are normally only encountered by professional specialists, and the means of reducing risk to an acceptable level may be complex and expensive.

 – Water flow in a locally consistent direction 
 – Environments where a pressure difference causes flow. Usually refers to cases where the flow is likely to entrain and pull the diver into an enclosed space or moving machinery. 

Outlets 
Drains

 – Diving from a vessel which may have propellers or thrusters in gear during the dive.

Environments by temperature
The temperature of the diving environment can influence the equipment used by the diver, and the time the diver can be exposed to the environment without excessive risk.
 – Water that is hot enough to require measures to keep the diver cool.
 – Water at temperatures where no thermal protection is necessary.
 – Water where heat loss is a critical hazard. Arbitrarily specified at below 10 °C for some training standards (Dive leader)
 – Water where surface layers are at or very near freezing point.

Environments by geography 
The geographical location of a dive site can have legal or environmental consequences.
 – Diving in tropical waters
 – Diving in temperate waters
 - Diving in polar waters

Environments by topography 

 – Away from any fixed solid reference points.

Environments by depth zone 

For technical divers, the recommended maximum depths are greater on the understanding that they will use less narcotic gas mixtures.  is the maximum depth authorised for divers who have completed Trimix Diver certification with IANTD or Advanced Trimix Diver certification with TDI.  is the world record depth on scuba (2014). Commercial divers using saturation techniques and heliox breathing gases routinely exceed , but they are also limited by physiological constraints.

From an oceanographic viewpoint:
 Shallow water, defined as between the surf-zone and the coast
 Intermediate water, defined as between the surf zone and wave base (where the waves just interact with the bottom and no more, usually about 80 m water depth with 10 second swells). The seafloor beneath intermediate water is termed the shoreface and is the zone where the seafloor slows down the swells by friction, so that the surf ends up being lower than it otherwise would be.
 Deep water, defined as deeper than wave base: i.e. too deep for waves to interact with the seafloor.
Recreational divers will usually dive in the shallow to intermediate marine environment. Technical and commercial divers may venture into the deep water environment.

Environments by professional activity

Diving medium

References

 
Occupational safety and health